"Crush on You" is a song by rapper Lil' Kim, released as the second single from her debut album, featuring fellow Junior M.A.F.I.A. member Lil' Cease. The Notorious B.I.G. raps the hook. It peaked at number 23 on the UK Singles Chart. The original album version had Lil' Cease rapping alone, while the single version featured him with Lil' Kim.

Background
The song was going to be a duet between Kim and Lil' Cease from the beginning, but after filming the music video for her debut single "No Time", Kim became pregnant; she would later decide to abort. After this, Kim took a musical hiatus. This resulted in the album version of the song featuring just Lil' Cease. The single version, retitled as a remix, features Kim. The "Crush on You" (Remix) was not featured on the "Crush on You" single, it was only featured on the "Not Tonight" single.

Samples
The song has been sampled many times since its release, including: 
 Mariah Carey sampled the beat on her song "A No No" from her album Caution in 2018, as well as various remixes of her song.

Music video
The music video was directed by Lance "Un" Rivera and it was filmed on January 29, 1997. The music video was released for the week ending on February 23, 1997. The music video for "Crush on You" is noted as being the first video to feature the different colored wigs that Kim became known for. The theme for the video, the changing floor colors, was based on the film The Wiz. After deciding on the theme, Kim and her stylist thought that her outfits should change to match the floor color, with Kim adding that she should wear wigs to match as well. The video consists of four colored setups, blue, yellow, green and red with Kim's outfits and wigs changing throughout to match.

Additionally,  Luke, Aaliyah, Leslie Segar, Ed Lover  and Sheek Louch make cameos in the music video.

UK CD single
"Crush on You" (Squeaky Clean Radio Edit) - 4:00
"Crush on You" (Desert Eagle Discs Remix - Short / Clean) - 5:39
"Crush on You" (Desert Eagle Discs Remix - Instrumental) - 7:03
"Crush on You" (Aim Remix) - 4:33
"Crush on You" (Aim Instrumental) 4:33
"Crush on You" (Acapella) 4:32

Credits
Vocals - Lil' Cease
Additional vocals - Notorious B.I.G.
Producer - Andreao "Fanatic" Heard"
Recorded at The Hit Factory
Engineer – Tony Black

Remix version
Engineer – Axel Niehaus
Producer - Andreao "Fanatic" Heard"

Charts

Weekly charts

Year-end charts

References

1997 singles
Lil' Kim songs
The Notorious B.I.G. songs
1996 songs
Songs written by the Notorious B.I.G.
Songs written by Lil' Kim
Atlantic Records singles
Songs written by Cam'ron
Songs written by Andreao Heard